Daniel-Henry Kahnweiler (25 June 1884 – 11 January 1979) was a German-born art collector, and one of the most notable French art dealers of the 20th century. He became prominent as an art gallery owner in Paris beginning in 1907 and was among the first champions of Pablo Picasso, Georges Braque and the Cubist movement in art.

Early life
Kahnweiler was born in 1884 in Mannheim, Baden to a prosperous Jewish family. His family had previously moved from Rockenhausen, a small village in the Palatinate. Kahnweiler grew up in Stuttgart and was trained to study finance and philosophy. His upbringing and education at a German Gymnasium prepared him for his life as an art connoisseur and pragmatic businessman. Early employment in the family business of stock brokerage in Germany and Paris gave way to an interest in art collecting while Kahnweiler was still in his twenties. He opened his first small art gallery (4 by 4 meters) in Paris in 1907 at 28 rue Vignon, at age 23. There was a family precedent for such an enterprise, since his uncle, who ran a famous stock brokerage house in London, was a major art collector of traditional English art works and furniture.

Art dealer

Kahnweiler is considered to have been one of the greatest supporters of the Cubist art movement through his activities as an art dealer and spokesman for artists. He was among the first people to recognize the importance and beauty of Picasso's Les Demoiselles d'Avignon and immediately wanted to buy it along with all of Picasso's works. Picasso wrote of Kahnweiler, "What would have become of us if Kahnweiler hadn't had a business sense?" Kahnweiler's appreciation of Picasso's talents was especially gratifying to the artist, since he was largely unknown and destitute at the time when many of his most famous works were created.

In his gallery, Kahnweiler supported many of the great artists of his time who found themselves without adequate recognition and little or no interest among collectors. Initial purchases included works by Kees van Dongen, André Derain, André Masson, Fernand Léger, Georges Braque, Juan Gris, Maurice de Vlaminck and several other artists of the same generation. To use his own word, Kahnweiler wanted to "defend" great artists, but only those who had no dealers and of whose talents he was convinced. Rather than exhibiting appealing works by established artists from the past and present, Kahnweiler championed burgeoning artists who had come from all over the globe to live and work in Montparnasse and Montmartre at the time. Thus Paul Cézanne, although a great artist, was considered too old to be represented, and his work was already represented by the dealer Ambroise Vollard in any case.

Along with such men as Alfred Flechtheim, Paul Cassirer, Daniel Wildenstein, Léonce Rosenberg and Paul Rosenberg, Kahnweiler was one of the influential art connoisseurs of the 20th century. As a businessman, Kahnweiler pioneered many new methods of working with artists and art dealing; these are now established practices in the industry.

In 1907, when there were only half a dozen viable galleries in Paris, he made contracts with artists to buy all of their work in order to free them from financial worries and permit them to concentrate on their creative work. He met with them daily to discuss their work, photographed each work they produced (he felt it imperative to have a record), held exhibitions of their work and promoted their work internationally. Since he considered himself friends with many of them, he co-owned little sailing boats with his artists.

As part of his activities in promoting the work of emerging artists, Kahnweiler sponsored the first exhibition of the work of Georges Braque. He encouraged the practice of publishing Beaux Livres (beautiful books), in which a contemporary artist would illustrate a work of a contemporary writer. He expanded his presentations by bringing together artists, writers and poets to produce their works as a joint project in more than 40 books. Picasso, for example, illustrated the works of Max Jacob. As a publisher of art with literary works, he had no equal, and was the first to sponsor publications by Max Jacob, Guillaume Apollinaire, André Masson, Gertrude Stein, Pablo Picasso, and many others. In doing so, he launched many literary careers.

Kahnweiler's entrepreneurial abilities were so acute that by the 1950s his art gallery was among the top 100 French companies in terms of export figures.

Art history
Although the financial support for artists was an important contribution to art history, he was also a significant figure for his work as an art historian and eyewitness to the emergence of Cubism during the period 1907–1914. When working in Paris, his spare time was devoted to reading and understanding the history of art and aesthetics. He also spent his time visiting the city's museums and art galleries. Besides the museums in Paris, he took trips around the European continent to see what was being shown in museums and art galleries outside France. He gave his first interview on Cubism in 1912, and it was actual historical events that led to his career as a historian. There is a view that Kahnweiler's sensibility was such that his gallery, and the way he styled and developed it, was as much a Cubist gallery as were the paintings by Picasso and the other Cubist painters. The gallery had a clear aesthetic position, uncompromising integrity, financial stability and creative development. During the years 1907-1914 his gallery was a central cradle for Cubism, not only to display the works, but where one also met the artists.

Concurrently, the primary means for avant-garde painters and sculptors to show their works to a wider audience remained the Salon des Indépendants and the Salon d'Automne. Kahnweiler forbade his 'gallery Cubists' from exhibiting at these major Salons, and by so doing, actually removed them from public view. From the viewpoint of the general public, Cubism came to be more associated with the 'Salon Cubists', such as Jean Metzinger, Albert Gleizes, Fernand Léger, Robert Delaunay, Henri Le Fauconnier, Marcel Duchamp and Francis Picabia.

World War I and World War II

The outbreak of World War I in 1914 not only ruptured the Cubist experiments in art, but also forced Kahnweiler to live in exile in Switzerland; due to his German citizenship, he was considered an alien under French law. Many German nationals living in France had their possessions sequestered by the French state, and as a result, Kahnweiler's collection was confiscated in 1914 and sold by the government in a series of auctions at the Hôtel Drouot between 1921 and 1923.

During the years of exile (until 1920), Kahnweiler studied and wrote works such as the Der Weg zum Kubismus and Confessions esthétiques. Writing becoming a passion he continued over his lifetime, and he authored hundreds of books and major articles. The second period of enforced writing came during a period of internal exile caused by the events of World War II.  As a Jew, the Nazis forced him to flee Paris. He remained in France, in hiding. "Under the clouds from the gas chambers," as he put it in his seminal work on Juan Gris.

At the end
Kahnweiler was very prolific as an author, but never produced a full autobiography. There was, however, a series of interviews first aired on French television, then published and translated as a book under the title Mes galleries et mes peintres ("My galleries and my painters"). For his 80th birthday, a Festschrift was published with contributions by the world's leading philosophers, art historians, and artists, all of whom emphasized the vital importance of his unique contribution to art history – an importance still not yet fully appreciated, probably due to the fact that he has been viewed mostly as an art dealer and not as an art historian. This situation has been aggravated because some of his major works on aesthetics were either never translated into English or badly translated. The omission of key elements of a proper understanding of Cubism and focus on small and sensational elements of his complex relationship with Picasso has led to a flawed understanding of the ideas he put forward in these writings.

Although revered by artists for his business and aesthetic sense and respected by art dealers and art historians, the true impact of his life and work has yet to be recognized, despite a 1988 biography by Pierre Assouline. He died in 1979 in Paris, aged 94.

Sources
John Richardson, A Life of Picasso: The Prodigy, 1881–1906, Publ. Alfred A. Knopf, 1991, 
John Richardson, A Life of Picasso: The Cubist Rebel, 1907-1916, Publ. Alfred A. Knopf, 1991, 
Malcolm Gee,  Dealers, critics, and collectors of modern painting: aspects of the Parisian art market between 1910 and 1930, London, Garland, 1981.

References

External links
 D. H. Kahnweiler on photographs by Vaclav Chochola
 New York Times review of Bio pic, retrieved online April 26, 2008

French art dealers
French art collectors
French art historians
German art dealers
German art collectors
20th-century art collectors
German art historians
Jewish artists
Jewish emigrants from Nazi Germany to France
Jewish art collectors
Businesspeople from Mannheim
Stockbrokers
1884 births
1979 deaths
French male non-fiction writers
German male non-fiction writers
20th-century French male writers
Art gallery owners